Sophia or Sophie Brahe or after marriage Sophie Thott Lange (24 August 1559 or 22 September 1556 – 1643), was a Danish noblewoman and horticulturalist with knowledge of astronomy, chemistry, and medicine. She worked alongside her brother Tycho Brahe in making astronomical observations.

Life
She was born in Knudstrup, Denmark (it would pass to Sweden in 1658) as the youngest of ten children, to Otte Brahe, the rigsråd, or advisor, to the King of Denmark; and Beate Bille Brahe, leader of the royal household for Queen Sophie. Sophia's oldest brother was astronomer Tycho Brahe. Though he was both more than a decade her senior and raised in a separate household, the pair became quite close by the time Sophia was a teenager. The brother and sister were united by their work in science, and by their family's opposition to science as an appropriate activity for members of the aristocracy.

She married Otto Thott in 1579, an older man than her: he was 33. She had one child with him before he died on 23 March 1588. Upon her husband's death, Sophie Thott managed his property in Eriksholm (today Trolleholm Castle), running the estate to keep it profitable until her son came of age. During this time, she also became a horticulturalist, in addition to her studies in chemistry and medicine. The gardens she created in Eriksholm were said to be exceptional. Sophie was particularly interested in studying chemistry and medicine according to Paracelsus, in which small doses of poison might serve as strong medicines, and used her skills to treat the local poor. She was devoted to the study of astrology and helped her brother with producing horoscopes.

On 21 July 1587, King Frederick II of Denmark signed a document transferring to Sophia Brahe title of Årup farm in what is now Sweden (Svensson, et al.).

Sophia continued to be a frequent visitor at Uranienborg where she met Erik Lange, a nobleman who studied alchemy and a friend of Tycho's. In 1590, Sophie took 13 visits to Uranienborg and became engaged to Lange. Lange used up most of his fortune with alchemy experiments, so their marriage was delayed some years while he avoided his creditors and traveled to Germany to try to find patrons for his work. Tycho Brahe wrote the Latin epic poem "Urania Titani" during the couple's separation, expressed as a letter from his sister Sophia to her fiancé in 1594. Tycho casts Sophia as Urania, muse of astronomy, a further suggestion of his respect for her scientific endeavours.

In 1599, she visited Lange in Hamburg, but they did not marry until 1602 in Eckernförde. They lived in this town for a while in extreme poverty. Sophie wrote a long letter to her sister Margrethe Brahe, describing having to wear stockings with holes in them for her wedding. Lange's wedding clothes had to be returned to the pawn shop after the wedding, because the couple could not afford to keep them. She expressed anger with her family for not accepting her science studies, and for depriving her of money owed to her. By 1608, Erik Lange was living in Prague, and he died there in 1613 (Det Kongelige Bibliotek).

Sophia was often ridiculed and avoided due to her personal life and marriage. Many alienated her due to her marriage to Erik Lange which was opposed by all in her family except for her brother Tycho.

Sophie Brahe personally financed the restoration of the local church, Ivetofta Kyrka. She planned to be buried there, and the lid for her unused sarcophagus remains in the church's armory (Svensson, et al.). But, by 1616 she had moved permanently to Zealand and settled in Helsingør. In Zealand, she lived specifically in Elsinore where she worked primarily on horticulture and healing plants. She spent her last years writing up the genealogy of Danish noble families, publishing the first major version in 1626 (there were later additions). Her work is still considered a major source for early history of Danish nobility (Det Kongelige Bibliotek). She died in Helsingør in the year 1643, and was buried in the Torrlösa old church in the village of Torrlösa, east of the town of Landskrona in what was then Denmark but now is southern Sweden. That church housed a burial chapel for the Thott family that remained for some time even after the church itself was pulled down in the mid-19th century (the new Torrlösa church was built nearby). Currently, a stone setting marks the outlines of the Thott chapel, while the tombstone for Sophie Brahe is still standing on the site.

Career and research 

Tycho wrote that he had trained Sophia in horticulture and chemistry, but he initially discouraged her from studying astronomy. Instead, Sophia learned astronomy on her own, studying books in German, and having Latin books translated with her own money so that she could read them as well. Later in both of their careers, Tycho began to discourage her from continuing her research into astronomy because he believed it to be too complex for the talents of a woman.

However, much of Tycho's apprehension about Sophia's learning actually did not come from concerns about her ability to perform astronomical observations. Rather, he worried that she would not be able to achieve the level of understanding necessary to work in the field of astrology, which was inextricably linked to astronomy. As astronomers, the Brahes would have been expected to provide horoscopes, which would have been taken very seriously by their customers.

Sophia frequently visited Uranienborg, Tycho's observatory on the then-Danish island of Hveen. There, she assisted him with astronomical observations associated with his publication De nova stella, or On the New Star. Specifically, she assisted with a set of observations on 11 November 1572, which led to the discovery of the supernova that is now called SN 1572, as well as observations of the 8 December 1573 lunar eclipse. The discovery of SN 1572 was especially significant in that it added to the growing body of evidence that seemed to refute the geocentric model of the universe. Sophia's assistance was also instrumental in Tycho's work on orbits, which was foundational to the modern methods used to predict the positions of the planets. Tycho's studies of orbits involved the most precise measurements of the planets' movements made prior to the invention of the telescope, and while Tycho created many of the astronomical devices used to conduct the measurements, Sophia was among the assistants who actually made the measurements.  Tycho did have other assistants, however, and while Sophia was present for each of these discoveries, the extent to which she contributed personally is unknown. Tycho did commend Sophia for her efforts, though, referring with admiration to Sophia's animus invictus, or "determined mind."

After her series of contributions in the 1570s, Sophia achieved more autonomy with regards to her astronomical research than before. Despite the serious doubts Tycho had previously expressed about Sophia's ability to comprehend the nuances of horoscopes, when he was frequently away from Uranienborg between 1588 and 1597, Sophia took on much of Tycho's astrological responsibilities with their clients.

Once some major observations were made by the Brahes, Tycho requested money from King Frederick II of Denmark, Frederick the Great, to move forward with more observation facilities in Hveen. The king was under the impression that the observatories were for Tycho and his personal research; however it is known that some of the observatories were made for Sophia to work in for her own observations. Much of the data that was gathered throughout Tycho's life was passed down to his pupil, Johannes Kepler, rather than his sister, Sophia Brahe. It can be said that the work that Sophia Brahe assisted her brother in laid the groundwork for Sir Isaac Newton.

As one can see Sophia was interested more in hands on experience and observations rather than experimenting. This really shines true during her marriage. Sophia remarries in 1602 to the alchemist Erik Lange. Lange, like many alchemists was striving to change different metal into gold. In the pursuit of this goal Lange, with the support of his wife, spent all of the money that the two had saved. They lived in extreme poverty until Erik Lange passed away. This allowed Brahe to move back with her son in Denmark, who likely supported her financially. Now she could continue her works in science and write the genealogy of Danish noble families.

Urania Titani
Urania Titani was a poem written by Tycho Brahe, the brother of Sophia, about a fictional love correspondence between Sophia and Erik. Tycho wrote the poem in Latin, a language Sophia was not fluent in.  In the poem, Tycho represents Sophia as Urania, the Muse of astronomy in Greek mythology, and Erik as a Titan, a son of Uranus (mythology). Sophia is depicted as longing for her husband while he studied abroad to study alchemy. his work established the co-dependence that Sophia and Tycho maintained, including their similar beliefs. Lastly, the poem was a large indicator of Tycho publicizing his bond with his sister, establishing himself as a Renaissance man and unashamed of his work with his sister.

Genealogy
Sophia is known for her work in genealogy. Sophia's first work was completed in 1600. During this time, genealogy was placed in documents called family books. These books contained many aspects of the family's life such as family members, traditions, and different family branches. In Sophia's renditions of her family book she included letters and correspondence with other women concerning their interwoven heritage and possible relatives. Sophia also included anecdotes from her family and rarely placed her own comments within her works. Sophia's work was common among women during her time, as women were valued for their penmanship and ability to maintain their households.

Legacy
Sophie, along with her brother Tycho, have come to represent the flowering of letters and science during the Danish Renaissance. She worked closely with her brother in his scientific endeavors and is thought to have acted as his muse. The two were so close that poet Johan L. Heiberg admonished that "Denmark must never forget the noble woman who, in spirit much more than flesh and blood, was Tycho Brahe's sister; the shining star in our Danish heaven is indeed a double one." In 1626 Sophie had completed a 900-page manuscript on the genealogies of 60 Danish noble families, which is held by Lund University.

See also
 Timeline of women in science

Notes

References

Further reading

External links

 Sophie Brahe
Sophie Brahe Manuscripts- The Royal Library (Copenhagen )

1556 births
1643 deaths
16th-century Danish scientists
16th-century Danish historians
17th-century Danish historians
Sophia
Danish women scientists
Women astronomers
16th-century Danish astronomers
16th-century women scientists
17th-century women scientists
16th-century chemists
17th-century chemists
17th-century Danish women writers
17th-century Danish scientists
17th-century Danish writers
16th-century Danish women
Danish women historians
People from Helsingør
17th-century Danish astronomers